Ioan Enciu (born 14 April 1953) is a Romanian politician, who, since the 2009 election has been a Member of the European Parliament for Romania, representing the Social Democratic Party. He sits, along with his party colleagues in the Progressive Alliance of Socialists and Democrats group.

Background
In 1976 he graduated from the Faculty of Hydrotechnics at the Institute of Construction. In 2003 he graduated from Faculty of Management, Academy of Economic Studies. 
Prior to entering politics he served in several consulting and management roles. He was also a local councillor in Bucharest from 1996 to 2007.

Parliamentary Activities
He serves on the following Parliamentary committees:
Committee on Civil Liberties, Justice and Home Affairs 
Delegation for relations with Canada 
He previously served on the Committee on Industry, Research and Energy and the Special Committee on Organised Crime, Corruption and Money Laundering

References

Living people
1953 births
People from Odorheiu Secuiesc
MEPs for Romania 2009–2014
Social Democratic Party (Romania) MEPs